Aleksander von Kothen  (8 April 1867 – 26 March 1917) was a Finnish politician. He was a member of the Senate of Finland.

Finnish politicians
Finnish senators
Finnish people of German descent
1867 births
1917 deaths